Suresh Deshmukh is an Indian politician and former member of the Indian National Congress, and the son of Bapusaheb Deshmukh. He was a Member of the Maharashtra Legislative Assembly from the Wardha constituency.

Deshmukh contested an Assembly election in 2009 from Wardha as an independent candidate and won by a large margin.

References

Living people
Year of birth missing (living people)
Indian politicians
Indian National Congress politicians from Maharashtra